Anthony Joseph Norman (born 24 February 1958) is a Welsh former professional footballer who played as a goalkeeper for Hull City, Sunderland and Huddersfield Town.

He holds the record for consecutive appearances for Hull City, playing 226 consecutive games between August 1983 and September 1988. In 2005, as part of the club's centenary celebrations, a poll was carried out to name the top 100 Tigers, and Norman was the highest-placed goalkeeper at number six. During his time at Boothferry Park, Hull completed a swift climb from the Fourth Division to the Second, and in 1986 finished sixth – their 2nd highest finish (they finished 5th in 1971) until they finally won promotion to the top flight 22 years later.

On leaving Hull City, he signed for Sunderland for a then club record fee. During his time at Roker Park, he helped them win promotion to the top fight in 1990 and also played at Wembley in the 1992 FA Cup Final, where they lost 2–0 to Liverpool. He played a starring role in that cup run, including Man of the Match displays away to West Ham and at home to Chelsea. He is the only goalkeeper to have played for Sunderland at the old Wembley stadium twice.

He departed from Sunderland in the summer of 1995 to sign for Brian Horton (who had been his manager at Hull City) at Huddersfield Town. He remained in West Yorkshire for two seasons until he finally called time on his playing career in 1997 at the age of 39.

During his lengthy career he played one season of top-flight football, when in 1990–91 he kept goal for a Sunderland side that suffered relegation on the final day of the season from the penultimate pre-Premiership First Division.

He made 5 international appearances for Wales, usually serving as deputy to the legendary Neville Southall.

Since retiring from professional football Norman has been diagnosed with a rare heart condition called cardiomyopathy. In 2005, he undertook a 190-mile charity walk in aid of the Children's Heart Federation.

In August 2008 Norman returned to Sunderland AFC as Academy Goalkeeping Coach.

He was appointed Goalkeeping Coach at Darlington 1883 in June 2012.

Norman was appointed goalkeeping coach at Gateshead on 21 July 2013.

References 

1958 births
Living people
Welsh footballers
Wales international footballers
Association football goalkeepers
English Football League players
Hull City A.F.C. players
Sunderland A.F.C. players
Huddersfield Town A.F.C. players
Sunderland A.F.C. non-playing staff
Gateshead F.C. non-playing staff
Association football goalkeeping coaches
FA Cup Final players